Kevin Satterlee is an American attorney and academic administrator serving as the 13th president of Idaho State University.

Early life and education 
Satterlee was born in Priest River, Idaho, on March 4, 1968. He earned a Bachelor of Arts degree in political science from Boise State University and Juris Doctor from the University of Idaho College of Law. Satterlee joined the Idaho State Bar in 1993.

Career 
After graduating from law school, Satterlee began his career as a private practice attorney before joining the Idaho Attorney General's office. Satterlee became the lead attorney for the Idaho State Board of Education, and eventually served as a deputy Idaho attorney general for six years.

Prior to taking office as president of Idaho State University, Satterlee served in several positions at Boise State University, including chief operating officer, vice president, and special counsel to the university's president.

References 

Living people
1968 births
Presidents of Idaho State University
Boise State University alumni
Idaho lawyers
University of Idaho alumni
People from Bonner County, Idaho